Jason Perry may refer to:

Jason Perry (safety) (born 1976), American football safety in the National Football League
Jason Perry (arena football) (born 1984), American football player who plays for the Jacksonville Sharks
Jason Perry (baseball) (born 1980), Major League Baseball outfielder
Jason Perry (footballer) (born 1970), Welsh footballer
Jason Perry (politician), mayor of Croydon, England
Jason Perry (singer) (born 1969), English singer-songwriter and member of A
Jason Perry, former member of Plus One